Guéra is one of the 23 regions of Chad, created in 2002 from the former Guéra prefecture. The region's capital is Mongo. , the population of the region was 553,795.

Geography
The region borders Batha Region to the north, Sila Region and Salamat Region to the east, Moyen-Chari Region to the south, and Chari-Baguirmi Region and Hadjer-Lamis Region to the west. The region contains several mountainous areas, such as the Kadam Massif and the Guéra Massif, the latter of which is composed of granites dissected by numerous dolerite dykes.

The region is the principal agricultural producing area in the whole country, producing cotton and groundnuts, the two main cash-crops of the country, as well as rice.

Half of the Zakouma National Park lies within the region.

Subdivisions

Departments
The region of Guéra is divided into four departments, namely:
Guéra (capital: Mongo)
Barh Signaka (capital: Melfi)
Abtouyour (capital: Bitkine)
Mangalmé (capital: Mangalmé)

Sub-prefectures
Mongo is the regional capital. Sub-prefectures are:

 Bang Bang
 Baro
 Bitchotchi
 Bitkine
 Chinguil
 Eref
 Kouka Margni
 Mangalmé
 Melfi
 Mokofi
 Niergui

Administration
As a part of decentralization in February 2003, the country is administratively split into regions, departments, municipalities and rural communities. The prefectures which were originally 14 in number were re-designated in 17 regions. The regions are administered by Governors appointed by the President. The Prefects, who originally held the responsibility of the 14 prefects, still retained the titles and were responsible for the administration of smaller departments in each region. The members of local assemblies are elected every six years, while the executive organs are elected every three years.

Demographics
As per the census of 2009, the population of the region was 553,795, 51.8 per cent female. The average size of a household  was 5.2 people: 5.2 in rural households and 5.3 in urban areas. The number of households was 106,348: 91,557 in rural areas and 14,791 in urban areas. The number of nomads in the region was 15,417 (4 per cent of the population). There were 552,378 people residing in private households. There were 239,451 above 18 years of age: 107,285 male and 132,166 female. The sex ratio was 93 females for every hundred males. There were 538,378 sedentary staff, comprising 5 per cent of the population.

As of 2016, the population of Guéra region was 564,910. There were 1,116 villages in 2016.

Ethnic groups
The main ethnolinguistic groups are broadly split into Arabs groups such as the Baggara, generally speaking Chadian Arabic (21.11%), and a diverse group of peoples collectively termed the Hadjarai (66.18%).

Hadjarai is an Arabic term and comprises numerous separate groups within Guéra. These Hadjerai ethnic groups speak a variety of East Chadic B languages, Bagirmi languages, and Bua languages, including:
 Barein
 Bidiyo
 Bolgo
 Dangaléat
 Kenga
 Migaama
 Mogum
 Sokoro

Other groups in the region include:
 Birgit
 Dar Daju Daju
 Disa
 Fania
 Gula groups such as the Bon Gula and Zan Gula
 Jaya
 Jonkor Bourmataguil
 Koke
 Mabire
 Mawa
 Mubi
 Mukulu
 Naba
 Saba
 Tamki
 Ubi
 Zirenkel

References

External links

 
Regions of Chad